Django Unchained is a 2012 American western film written and directed by Quentin Tarantino. It stars Jamie Foxx as Django, a freed slave, who teams up with a bounty hunter called Dr. King Schultz (Christoph Waltz) to free his wife from plantation owner Calvin Candie (Leonardo DiCaprio). Django Unchained was screened for the first time at the Directors Guild of America on December 1, 2012. Its official premiere was cancelled in the wake of the Sandy Hook Elementary School shooting and was replaced with a screening for the cast and crew. Django Unchained was released on December 25, 2012 in the United States and on January 18, 2013 in the United Kingdom. As of December 7, 2013, Django Unchained has earned over $425 million at the box office.

The film has garnered various awards and nominations, with most nominations recognising the film itself, Tarantino's screenplay and the cast's acting performances, particularly those of Christoph Waltz and Leonardo DiCaprio. The American Film Institute included Django Unchained in their list of the Top Ten Movies of the Year, while the African-American Film Critics Association nominated it for Best Picture. The film gathered five Academy Award nominations in categories ranging from Best Original Screenplay to Best Cinematography and Best Sound Editing. The production designer for Django Unchained, J. Michael Riva, received a posthumous nomination for Excellence in Production Design for a Period Film from the Art Directors Guild. Tarantino earned a Best Original Screenplay nod from the Broadcast and Chicago Film Critics Associations.

The British Academy Film Awards nominated the film for five accolades, including Best Direction and Best Editing. Django Unchained also gathered five nominations from the Golden Globe Awards and came away with Best Screenplay and Best Supporting Actor for Waltz. The film received seven nominations from the MTV Movie Awards. The NAACP Image Awards nominated Foxx, Samuel L. Jackson and Kerry Washington for Best Actor or Supporting Actor awards, while the film was nominated for Outstanding Motion Picture. The National Board of Review included Django Unchained in their Best Film category and awarded DiCaprio the Best Supporting Actor accolade. The film was also nominated for Best Picture from the Producers Guild of America. Django Unchained garnered eight nominations from the St. Louis Gateway Film Critics Association, the most of any film, but came away with three awards.

Awards and nominations

References

External links
 

Lists of accolades by film
Quentin Tarantino